Arthrobacter koreensis is an alkalitolerant bacterium species from the genus Arthrobacter which has been isolated from soil from Daejon, Korea.

References

Further reading

External links
Type strain of Arthrobacter koreensis at BacDive -  the Bacterial Diversity Metadatabase

Bacteria described in 2003
Micrococcaceae